Vasily Sergeyevich Smirnov (Russian: Василий Сергеевич Смирнов; 12 August 1858 – 17 December 1890) was a Russian painter in the Academic style who specialized in scenes from ancient history.

Biography 
He was born to a family of the Russian nobility. His father served as a chamberlain at the Imperial Court and Marshal of the nobility in the Klinsky District. He apparently decided upon art as a career through the influence of Vasily Perov, a friend of the family. In 1875, he enrolled at the Moscow School of Painting, Sculpture and Architecture. He participated in an exhibition there in 1878, winning a silver medal.

That same year, he transferred to the Imperial Academy of Arts in Saint Petersburg, where he studied with Pyotr Shamshin and Pavel Chistyakov. In 1882, he was granted leave from the Academy due to "chronic catarrh" of the lungs. The following year, he was awarded the title of "Artist" and a stipend to study abroad.

He went to Italy, via Vienna, and eventually settled in Rome. The summer heat proved too intense, so he moved to Turin, then spent some time in Paris, exhibiting at the Salon.

In 1885, he made sketches at Pompeii, which was the start of his interest in Classical subjects. The following year, he began work on "The Death of Nero", which took two years to complete. It was sent to Saint Petersburg and, after several showings, was bought by Tsar Alexander III.

In 1889, he became an associate professor at the Academy, but stayed for only a short time as his lung condition (diagnosed as tuberculosis) continued to worsen. The Italian climate had no beneficial effect so, sensing the end was near, he decided to return to the family estate. He died while in transit, on the train between Kubinka and Golitsyno. His brother organized a major exhibition in 1891, which included several unfinished paintings.

See also
 List of Orientalist artists
 Orientalism

Works

References

Literary sources

External links 

"The Fate of Vasily Smirnov" by Vladimir Rogoza @ Школа Жизни

1858 births
1890 deaths
19th-century painters from the Russian Empire
19th-century deaths from tuberculosis
Artists from Moscow
History painters
Orientalist painters
Russian male painters
Tuberculosis deaths in Russia
19th-century male artists from the Russian Empire
Moscow School of Painting, Sculpture and Architecture alumni